Fame is an American television series originally produced between January 7, 1982, and May 18, 1987, by Eilenna Productions in association with Metro-Goldwyn-Mayer Television and sponsored by Yamaha musical instruments, which are prominently showcased in the episodes. The show is based on the 1980 motion picture of the same name. Using a mixture of comedy, drama and music, it followed the lives of the students and faculty at the New York City High School for the Performing Arts, now known as the Fiorello H. LaGuardia High School of Music & Art and Performing Arts. Most interior scenes were filmed in Hollywood, California. In all seasons except the third, the show filmed several exterior scenes on location in New York City.

The popularity of the series around the world, most notably in the United Kingdom, led to several hit records and live concert tours by the cast. Despite its success, few of the actors maintained high-profile careers after the series was cancelled. Several of the cast members were seen again briefly in Bring Back...Fame, a reunion special made for Channel 4 in the United Kingdom in 2008.

Episodes

Cast

Faculty
Debbie Allen as Lydia Grant
Albert Hague as Benjamin Shorofsky
Michael Thoma as Greg Crandall (season 1)
Carol Mayo Jenkins as Elizabeth Sherwood (seasons 1–5, final episode of season 6)
Ann Nelson as Mrs. Gertrude Berg (seasons 1.07–6)
Morgan Stevens as David Reardon (season 2; recurring seasons 3–4)
Ken Swofford as Principal Quentin Morloch (seasons 3–5.09)
Graham Jarvis as Principal Bob Dyrenforth (seasons 5.10–6)
Eric Pierpoint as Paul Seeger (season 6.03)

Students

Carlo Imperato as Danny Amatullo
Gene Anthony Ray as Leroy Johnson
P. R. Paul as Montgomery MacNeil (season 1, final episode of season 6)
Lori Singer as Julie Miller (seasons 1–2)
Erica Gimpel as Coco Hernandez (seasons 1–3.08, episode of season 4, final episode of season 6)
Lee Curreri as Bruno Martelli (seasons 1–3, final episode of season 6)
Valerie Landsburg as Doris Schwartz (seasons 1–4, final episode of season 6)
Billy Hufsey as Christopher Donlon (seasons 3–6)
Cynthia Gibb as Holly Laird (seasons 3–5.10, final episode of season 6)
Janet Jackson as Cleo Hewitt (season 4)
Jesse Borrego as Jesse Velasquez (seasons 4–6)
Nia Peeples as Nicole Chapman (seasons 4.02–6.10)
Page Hannah as Kate Riley (season 5.10)
Loretta Chandler as Dusty Tyler (seasons 5–6)
Carrie Hamilton as Reggie Higgins (seasons 5.10-6)
Michael Cerveris as Ian Ware (season 6)
Elisa Heinsohn as Jillian Beckett (season 6.02)
Olivia Barash as Maxie Sharp (season 6.12)

Recurring characters
Carmine Caridi as Angelo Martelli (seasons 1–2)
Judy Farrell as Charlotte Miller (seasons 1–3)
Michael DeLorenzo as Michael (seasons 1–3)
Bronwyn Thomas as Michelle (seasons 1–4)
David Greenlee as Dwight Mendenhall (seasons 2–5)
Connie Needham as Kelly Hayden (season 2)
Stephanie E. Williams as Stephanie Harrison (season 2)
Jimmy Osmond as Troy Phillips (season 2)
Phoebe Yardon-Lewis as Alicia Morgan (season 3)
Sam Slovick as Cassidy (season 4)
Dick Miller as Lou Mackie (seasons 4–6)
Robert Romanus as Miltie Horowitz (seasons 5–6)
Caryn Ward as Tina Johnson (seasons 5–6)
Carolyn J. Silas as Laura Mackie (season 6)
Denny Dillon as Corky (season 6)

Production
The show was produced by MGM Television and aired Thursday nights at 8:00–9:00 on NBC beginning on January 7, 1982. NBC promoted its Thursday line-up (Fame, Cheers, Taxi [later Night Court], and Hill Street Blues) as "The Best Night of Television on Television!" Despite glowing reviews from critics, ratings were less than impressive, and NBC cancelled Fame after only two seasons. However, by special arrangement with LBS Communications, MGM revived the series for first-run syndication in the fall of 1983, where it continued for four more seasons, with the last first-run episode airing in the US on May 18, 1987.

Four cast members from the original movie appeared in the television series. Lee Curreri portrayed the character Bruno Martelli, an introverted musical genius. Gene Anthony Ray portrayed Leroy Johnson, a tough hood from the projects with a natural talent for dance, who muscles his way into an audition and wins. In the film, Leroy is also semiliterate, but this was dropped in favor of him having "fourth-grade reading level" in the television series. Albert Hague played teacher Benjamin Shorofsky, a German music teacher who constantly battled with Bruno Martelli over musical styles. The final cast member from the film was Debbie Allen, who portrayed Lydia Grant. Allen only appeared briefly in the movie, but her character was expanded in the series. She also became the show's original choreographer, in addition to directing several episodes and co-producing one season.

Several characters were carried over from the movie, played by different actors. Irene Cara portrayed Coco Hernandez in the film, but the part on TV was played by Erica Gimpel. Actor Paul McCrane played gay student Montgomery McNeil in the film, but P.R. Paul portrayed Montgomery for TV and the character was no longer gay. English teacher Elizabeth Sherwood was played in the film by actress Anne Meara, but in the series was played by actress Carol Mayo Jenkins. The character Doris had her name changed from Doris Finsecker (portrayed by Maureen Teefy) to Doris Schwartz (Valerie Landsburg). The character of Ralph Garci (Tommy Aguilar inheriting the role played in the film by Barry Miller) appeared only in the pilot.

Also, two new characters were introduced in the TV series: cello player Julie Miller (Lori Singer), and actor-comedian Danny Amatullo (whose last name is named after the associate producer, Tony Amatullo) played by Carlo Imperato.

Ira Steven Behr wrote 12 episodes of the series. He recalled: "I did three years on Fame, which was a lot of fun and was also in syndication. We had no one looking over our shoulder. We got to do some wonderfully bizarre things on the show, and the only time they gave us any trouble was the last show I was going to write after I knew we were cancelled. It was going to be Road Warrior meets Fame. It was a show that takes place in the future, and you could only sing for the state. It was a fascist society, and we were going to have motorcycles going through the school and have Iggy Pop as the guest star. It was great, and I was in the midst of writing the episode when somehow MGM read somewhere that we planned to burn down the sets, which was a lie. We were going to trash them a bit, but it wasn't the last episode. We had one more after that, and they stopped me from writing it."

Following its cancellation, two versions of the series were syndicated in reruns: the original hour-long episodes, which usually contained a primary plot, a subplot, and two or more musical numbers; and a second version, stripped of the musical numbers and the subplot and reduced to 30 minutes in length.

The show's theme song was a pop hit for singer Irene Cara, having been featured in the motion picture. A re-recorded version of the theme, using similar instrumentation to the 1980 track, was used in the TV series and sung by co-star Erica Gimpel, who played Coco Hernandez.

Although Gimpel left the series midway through the third season (after the show moved from NBC to first-run syndication in 1983), her opening vocals were still heard on the show for two more seasons. An updated version of the song, featuring a modern, synthesized hard-rock flavor, was introduced in the fall of 1985 and performed by new cast member Loretta Chandler (Dusty). This version ran for the final two seasons of Fame.

"I Still Believe In Me", from an episode of the series titled "Passing Grade", was nominated for an Emmy Award for Best Original Song. It was performed by Erica Gimpel and Debbie Allen, and co-written by Gary Portnoy, who went on to co-write and sing the theme from Cheers. In the United Kingdom, two singles credited to The Kids from "Fame", "Hi-Fidelity" and "Starmaker", peaked within the top ten of the UK Singles Chart.

The arts-focused cable network Ovation began airing reruns of Fame in 2011 for a period.

International broadcasts
 France: Series started on March 6, 1982, on TF1
 United Kingdom: Series started on June 17, 1982, on BBC One. Only the first four seasons were screened on BBC One; the full series was broadcast on The Children's Channel in 1992.  The BBC also helped pay for seasons 3 and 4. On November 7, 2021, music channel Now 80s begin showing the series.
 Sweden: Series started on September 5, 1982, on SVT1
 Israel: Series started in 1982
 Italy: Series was renamed "Saranno famosi" (literally, "They Will Be Famous"), started in January 1983 on Rai Due who also helped pay for seasons 3 and 4
 Brazil: Series started in 1983 on Rede Manchete
 Australia: Aired on the Seven Network
Hong Kong: Aired on Asia Television on Saturdays in 1984-85

Home media
Sony Pictures Home Entertainment released the first season of Fame to DVD in Region 1 on November 1, 2005.

20th Century Fox, under license from MGM and MGM Television, released the complete first and second seasons of Fame on DVD in Region 1 and Region 2 on September 15, 2009. On January 12, 2010, Fox released seasons 1 and 2 in separate collections.

DVD releases also followed a similar pattern in Europe and Australia. Due to licensing issues, all DVDs contain some unspecified music substitutions.

Awards

The series won a number of Emmy awards, and in 1983 and 1984, it won the Golden Globe Awards: Television, Best Series, Musical/Comedy. Actress, director and choreographer Debbie Allen, who had a small role in the motion picture, but played a major character in the television version, also won several awards.

Bring Back...Fame
On 27 December 2008, Channel 4 in the United Kingdom (despite Fame having originally been aired in Britain on BBC One) aired a 90-minute special titled Bring Back...Fame, which sought out and reunited some of the original cast members of the television series.

Hosted by Justin Lee Collins, and apparently filmed the previous summer, the show followed the presenter around the United States as he tracked down actors from the series and then staged a reunion. The program showed Collins appearing to surprise the former cast members in locations, including restaurants, a recording studio, a gym, LAX airport, and a cinema, before interviewing them and persuading them to take part in the reunion.

The actors featured were Debbie Allen, Carol Mayo Jenkins, Lee Curreri, Erica Gimpel, Valerie Landsburg, and Carlo Imperato. Also interviewed were Irene Cara and the mother of the late Gene Anthony Ray. Whether other actors from the series had also been approached but had declined to take part was not stated. Excerpts from the TV series were shown throughout the programme. The final scenes showed the six principal actors and a number of backing dancers taking part in a recreation of the title sequence of the TV programme.

See also

 The Kids from "Fame" – an article on the recording group
 Un Paso Adelante (Spanish series based on Fame)
 Fame Looks at Music '83
 Fame (1980 film)

References

External links

Fame TV Series Archive
Fame U.K. Reunion 2019/2022

1982 American television series debuts
1987 American television series endings
1980s American drama television series
1980s American music television series
1980s American high school television series
1980s American teen drama television series
NBC original programming
Fame (franchise)
First-run syndicated television programs in the United States
Live action television shows based on films
Television series by MGM Television
Best Musical or Comedy Series Golden Globe winners
American television series revived after cancellation
English-language television shows
Television series about educators
Television series about teenagers
Television shows set in New York City
Works about performing arts education